The Åselistraumen Bridge is a bridge that crosses the Åselistraumen strait in the municipality of Bodø in Nordland county, Norway. The concrete bridge is part of Norwegian County Road 17.

See also
List of bridges in Norway
List of bridges in Norway by length
List of bridges
List of bridges by length

References

External links
Webcam on the bridge
A picture of the Åselistraumen Bridge
Another picture of the bridge

Buildings and structures in Bodø
Road bridges in Nordland
Norwegian County Road 17
Roads within the Arctic Circle